The 2022 National Arena League season was the fifth and most recent season of the National Arena League (NAL). The league played with only six teams from around the Eastern United States area, with one new team arriving from the American Arena League, which were the San Antonio Gunslingers. The season ended with the Albany Empire, Carolina Cobras, Columbus Lions, and Jacksonville Sharks all going into the playoffs. The season ended with the Albany Empire winning the championship. In July, the league announced that they will have a expansion team for the following season, which was shown to be given to Fayetteville, North Carolina.

Teams 
For 2022, the NAL consisted of six teams without conferences or divisions. Each team with the exception of the Carolina Cobras and the Jacksonville Sharks (they both played 14 games) played 12 games, six home and six away, while the 14-game teams had seven home and seven away. During the season, there were two byes given out, with the exception of the Carolina Cobras and the Jacksonville Sharks, where they do not get a bye week.

Reference for teams in 2022:

Standings 

z – clinched home field advantage

y – clinched home playoff game

e – eliminated from playoffs

Reference:

Playoffs 
Reference:

Awards

Players of the Week 

Reference:

The 2022 All-National Arena League Team

2022 All-NAL Second Team

Offense

Defense

Special Teams 

Reference:

2022 All-NAL First Team

Offense

Defense

Special Teams 

Reference:

Start of Ironman football 
For the season, the teams played Ironman football. This concept was also used from the Arena Football League, a league that was used the concept from 1987 up to 2007. Ironman football is a variant that allows players to play in both the offense and the defense for the game. Only two players from the offense, two players from the defense, and one player from the special teams can have a player who has their position for just one side of the ball. The goal of the Ironman football is that you can see players become more creative by showing their skills of offense and defense.

Controversies 
 In a game between the Orlando Predators and the San Antonio Gunslingers, after official Andrew McGrath got injured and taken to the hospital in the second quarter due to a broken clavicle and a face laceration, and there were only four referees left. In the fourth quarter, with 24 seconds left, a Gunslinger was close to the end zone, and one referee signaled touchdown while the other signaled him short of the goal line, however, the clock kept until the time was out while the referees were discussing the play. After review, the runner was short of the goal line. The clock was set to four seconds left, however, per league rules there was a 10 second run-off since the ball wasn't spotted before the previous play. The Gunslingers then scored the game-winning play. After a review by Commissioner Chris Siegfried, the lead official, and the Supervisor of Officials, they decided that that was the correct call.

 In a game between the Jacksonville Sharks and the San Antonio Gunslingers, Jacksonville player Devin Wilson hit official Gary Vaught from behind. The player was suspended indefinitely.

References

See also 
2022 Indoor Football League season

National Arena League seasons